Doussard is a commune in the southeastern French department of Haute-Savoie.

The village contains a landing field used by many paragliders, usually after they've taken off from the nearby Col de la Forclaz.

See also
Communes of the Haute-Savoie department

References

Communes of Haute-Savoie